This is a partial list of notable Canadians of full or partial Polish ancestral or national descent.

Business
Moses Znaimer, broadcasting executive
Mik Kersten, computer engineer
Piotr Szulczewski, founder of Wish

Science and engineering
 Casimir Gzowski – engineer who worked on Welland Canal, New York & Erie Railway (first Commissioner  of the Niagara Parks Commission)
 Leon Katz, FRSC (1909–2004)  – Officer of the Order of Canada, Professor University of Saskatchewan, physicist
 Karol Józef Krótki, FRSC – demography professor, statistician
 Witold Rybczynski – architect, professor and writer
 Lucas Skoczkowski – founder and CEO of Redknee
 Adam Skorek – professor of electrical and computer engineering
 Nicole Tomczak-Jaegermann, FRSC – mathematics professor
 Janusz Żurakowski – Battle of Britain fighter pilot

Education
 Isaac Hellmuth – from Warsaw, via England; one of the founders of the University of Western Ontario
 Conrad Swan – descended from Polish noble family, Swiecicki; first Canadian appointed to the College of Arms in London

Politics
 Leon David Crestohl – former Liberal MP, Cartier, (1950–1963)
 Bonnie Crombie – former Liberal MP, Mississauga—Streetsville (2008–2011), Mayor of Mississauga, Ontario (2014–present)
 Jan Dukszta – former Ontario NDP MPP, Parkdale (1971–1981)
 Gary Filmon – former Premier of Manitoba (1988–1999), Manitoba PC MLA, River Heights (1979–1981) and Tuxedo (1981–2000)
 Jesse Flis – former Liberal MP Parkdale—High Park (1979–1984; 1988–1997)
 Casimir Gzowski – Acting Lieutenant Governor of Ontario (1896–1897)
 Stanley Haidasz – former Liberal MP for Trinity (1957–1958) and Parkdale (1962–1978); Minister of State for Multiculturalism (1972–1974); Senator (1978–1998)
 Andrew Kania – former Liberal Member of Parliament for Brampton West (2008–2011)
 Irek Kusmierczyk – Liberal Member of Parliament for Windsor-Tecumseh (2019 - )
 Stan Kazmierczak Keyes – former national chair of Liberal Party of Canada (2002–2004); Liberal MP Hamilton West (1988–2004); Minister of National Revenue, Minister of State (Sport), Minister Responsible for the Canada Post Corporation and Minister Responsible for the Royal Canadian Mint (2003–2004)
 Alexandre-Édouard Kierzkowski – former Liberal MP St. Hyacinthe (1867–1870), First MP of Polish Descent
 Tom Kmiec – Conservative MP, Calgary Shepard (2015–present)
 Chris Korwin-Kuczynski – former Toronto city councillor (1981–2003)
 Ken Kowalski – former Deputy Premier of Alberta (1992–1994), former Alberta Government Minister, Speaker of the Legislative Assembly of Alberta (1997–2012), Alberta PC MLA (1979–2012)
 Wladyslaw Lizon – former Conservative MP for Mississauga East-Cooksville (2011–2015) and former president of the Canadian Polish Congress (2005–2010)
 Thomas Lukaszuk – former Deputy Premier of Alberta (2012–2013), former Alberta Government Minister (2010–2014), and PC MLA for Edmonton-Castle Downs (2001–2015)
 Gary Malkowski – former Ontario NDP MPP, York East (1990–1995), Canada's first deaf parliamentarian
 Don Mazankowski – former Deputy Prime Minister for Brian Mulroney (1986–1993), former federal government Minister (1979–1980; 1984–1993), Progressive Conservative MP Vegreville (1968–1993)
 Peter Milczyn – former Member of Toronto City Council (2000–2014), current Liberal MPP Etobicoke—Lakeshore (2013–2018)
 Ted Opitz – former Conservative MP for Etobicoke Centre (2011–2015)
 Fred Rose – former Labor-Progressive (Communist) MP Cartier (1943–1947); only MP ever convicted of spying for a foreign country, his capture as a Soviet spy helped to start the Cold War
 John Yakabuski – Ontario Progressive Conservative MPP Renfrew—Nipissing—Pembroke (2003–present), son of Paul Yakabuski
 Paul Yakabuski – former Ontario Progressive Conservative MPP, (1963–1987), father of John Yakabuski
 Ed Ziemba – former Ontario NDP MPP, High Park—Swansea (1975–1981), brother-in-law of Elaine Ziemba
 Elaine Ziemba – former Ontario NDP MPP, High Park—Swansea (1990–1995), sister-in-law of Ed Ziemba

Music
 Dan Bryk – singer-songwriter
 Walter Buczynski – composer
 Basia Bulat – singer-songwriter
 Anna Cyzon – singer-songwriter
 Janina Fialkowska – pianist, born in Montreal
 Steve Jocz – drummer for Sum 41
 Ben Kowalewicz – lead singer for Billy Talent
 Geddy Lee – bassist, keyboardist and lead vocalist for Rush
 Jan Lisiecki – pianist-virtuoso, born in Calgary
 Margaret Maye – singer and actress
 Andrzej Rozbicki – conductor
 Daniel Wnukowski – pianist

Culture and media
 Andrzej Busza – poet
 Bogdan Czaykowski – poet, translator, essayist
 Alex Debogorski – veteran ice road trucker on the television series Ice Road Truckers
 Peter Gzowski – broadcaster, writer and reporter
 Wacław Iwaniuk – poet in Polish, literary critic and essayist
 Jacqueline Milczarek – journalist, news anchor
 Anne Mroczkowski – journalist, news anchor
 Estanislao (Stan) Oziewicz – journalist, The Globe and Mail
 George Radwanski – editor-in-chief of the Toronto Star
 Chava Rosenfarb – novelist, poet in Yiddish, wife of Henry Morgentaler
 Adam Smoluk – director, screenwriter and actor
 Eva Stachniak – writer
 Mark Starowicz – head of CBC Television Documentary Programming unit, journalist and TV producer
 Alexandra Szacka – CBC/Radio-Canada correspondent
 Jack L. Warner - film executive, co-founder of Warner Bros, born to Polish Jewish parents

Actors
 Magda Apanowicz – actress
 Lara Jean Chorostecki – actress
 Henry Czerny – actor
 Paloma Kwiatkowski – actress
 Lisa Ray – actress
 Devon Sawa – actor

Military
 Andrew Charles Mynarski VC – Second World War airman
 Walter J. Natynczyk – Chief of the Defence Staff of the Canadian Forces
 Stefan Sznuk – Major General

Sports
 Turk Broda – ice hockey goalie
 Shane Churla – player, NHL
 Peter Czerwinski – competitive eater and bodybuilder
 Gabriela Dabrowski – professional tennis player
 Adam Fantilli - ice hockey centre
 Wayne Gretzky – hockey legend
 Frank Jerwa - ice hockey left wing
 Joe Jerwa - ice hockey defenseman
 Michael Klukowski – soccer player for Club Brugge
 Walter "Killer" Kowalski – professional wrestler
 Joe Krol – Toronto Argonauts player
 Tomasz Kucharzewski – martial artist
 Stan Mikawos – Winnipeg Blue Bombers player, CFL
 Ben Pakulski – professional bodybuilder
 Jim Peplinski – Calgary Flames, NHL
 Chris Pozniak – soccer player who currently plays for San Jose Earthquakes
 Tomasz Radzinski – soccer player
 Krzysztof Soszynski – mixed martial artist
 Dave Stala – Hamilton Tiger-Cats player CFL
 Trish Stratus – WWE Diva
 John Tavares – ice hockey player for the Toronto Maple Leafs
 Larry Trader – played for Detroit, St. Louis, Montreal, 1982–1988
 Wojtek Wolski – player NHL
 Aleksandra Wozniak – professional tennis player
 Penny Oleksiak – Canadian National Team Swimmer
Jamie Oleksiak – NHL Player Dallas Stars

References

Polish-Canadians

Canadians
Canadians
Polish